Wagner Aparecido Coradin Junior (born 3 October 1989), known as Wagner Coradin or just Wagner, is a Brazilian footballer who plays as a goalkeeper for Portuguesa.

Club career
Born in Barretos, São Paulo, Wagner was a Mirassol youth graduate. He made his senior debut in the 2009 Copa Paulista with the club, before joining Corinthians Alagoano on loan for the 2010 Campeonato Alagoano.

In March 2010, Wagner signed for União São João, but after failing to play a single minute for the side, he was loaned to Independente de Limeira in June. He subsequently moved abroad, joining Destroyers in the Liga Nacional B; in that season, the club reached the promotion/relegation play-offs, but failed to achieve promotion as he scored an own goal in the last match.

Wagner left Destroyers in December 2012, and returned to his home country with Grêmio Barueri in the Série C. He signed for Nacional-AM ahead of the 2014 season, before returning to his native state with Olímpia.

Wagner returned to Nacional on 6 December 2014, but was mainly a backup option. He was presented at Ituano on 17 December 2015, being always a second-choice during his three-year period at the club.

On 8 November 2018, Wagner was announced at Campinense for the 2019 campaign. He gained national notoriety in a Campeonato Paraibano match against Botafogo-PB, as he kneeled down to be interviewed by a journalist with limited mobility and smaller height.

On 11 October 2019, Wagner agreed to a contract with ABC, but moved to Ferroviária the following 24 January. A backup to Saulo, he signed for Portuguesa on 7 December 2021.

Career statistics

Honours
Nacional
Campeonato Amazonense: 2014, 2015

Portuguesa
Campeonato Paulista Série A2: 2022

References

External links
 

1989 births
Living people
Footballers from São Paulo (state)
Brazilian footballers
Association football goalkeepers
Campeonato Brasileiro Série C players
Campeonato Brasileiro Série D players
Mirassol Futebol Clube players
União São João Esporte Clube players
Sport Club Corinthians Alagoano players
Independente Futebol Clube players
Club Destroyers players
Grêmio Barueri Futebol players
Nacional Futebol Clube players
Olímpia Futebol Clube players
Ituano FC players
Campinense Clube players
ABC Futebol Clube players
Associação Ferroviária de Esportes players
Associação Portuguesa de Desportos players
People from Barretos